Kanakanavu (also spelled Kanakanabu) is a Southern Tsouic language spoken by the Kanakanavu people, an indigenous people of Taiwan (see Taiwanese aborigines). It is a Formosan language of the Austronesian family.

The Kanakanavu live in the two villages of Manga and Takanua in Namasia District (formerly Sanmin Township), Kaohsiung.

The language is moribund.

History 
The native Kanakanavu speakers were Taiwanese aboriginals living on the islands. Following the Dutch Colonial Period in the 17th century, Han-Chinese immigration began to dominate the islands population. The village of Takanua is a village assembled by Japanese rulers to relocate various aboriginal groups in order to establish easier dominion over these groups.

Phonology 
There are 14 different consonant phonemes, containing only voiceless plosives within Kanakanavu. Adequate descriptions of liquid consonants become a challenge within Kanakanavu. It also contains 6 vowels plus diphthongs and triphthongs. Vowel length is often not clear if distinctive or not, as well as speakers pronouncing vowel phonemes with variance. As most Austronesian and Formosan languages, Kanakanavu has a  CV syllable structure (where C = consonant, V = vowel). Very few, even simple words, contain less than three to four syllables.

Consonants

Vowels

Orthography 
Kanakanavu is usually written with the Latin script. The following are often used to represent sounds in the language: A, C, E, I, K, L, M, N, Ng, O, P, R, S, T, U, Ʉ, V,  ' /ʔ.

C represents the phoneme /c/.

L represents the phonemes /ɗ/ and /ɽ/.

P represents both /ɓ/ and /p/.

/ɫ/ is spelled as hl.

References

Further reading

External links

 www.kanakanavu.info – language documentation project website
 Yuánzhùmínzú yǔyán xiànshàng cídiǎn 原住民族語言線上詞典  – Kanakanavu search page at the "Aboriginal language online dictionary" website of the Indigenous Languages Research and Development Foundation
 Endangered Languages
 Kanakanavu teaching and leaning materials published by the Council of Indigenous Peoples of Taiwan 
 Kanakanavu translation of President Tsai Ing-wen's 2016 apology to indigenous people – published on the website of the presidential office

Formosan languages
Languages of Taiwan
Endangered Austronesian languages